The Blood Mountain Wilderness was designated in 1991 and currently consists of . The Wilderness is located within the borders of the Chattahoochee National Forest in Lumpkin County and Union County, Georgia.  The Wilderness is managed by the United States Forest Service and is part of the National Wilderness Preservation System.  In November, 1999, three fires burned through parts of the Blood Mountain Wilderness and the Chatahoochee National Forest.  Fire crews came from across the nation to help fight the fires.

The highest elevation in the Blood Mountain Wilderness is the  peak of Blood Mountain.  The Wilderness includes  of the Appalachian Trail, which may be the most heavily used portion of the AT.  The Blood Mountain Wilderness is the first wilderness encountered on the AT after its starting point on Springer Mountain.

Due to conflicts with black bears, in 2012 the Forest Service implemented a seasonal requirement for all overnight campers to carry bear-resistant canisters.  The requirement goes into effect every year, from March 1 to June 1, and it encompasses all areas within quarter mile of the AT, from Jarrard Gap to Neels Gap.

See also

References

External links 
Blood Mountain Wilderness - Wilderness.net

Wilderness areas of Georgia (U.S. state)
IUCN Category Ib
Protected areas of the Appalachians
Protected areas of Lumpkin County, Georgia
Protected areas of Union County, Georgia
Protected areas established in 1991
Chattahoochee-Oconee National Forest
1991 establishments in Georgia (U.S. state)